The Dawood Group (Urdu: داؤد گروپ), also Dawood Group of Companies, is a term widely used in Pakistan for diverse businesses and industries of the Dawood family-business, founded by Seth Ahmed Dawood (1905-2002). The term Dawood Group is therefore a phrase rather than an registered entity, used to describe a platform for the establishment of diverse businesses and industries in the early decades after the independence of Pakistan (1950-1960s).

Ahmed Dawood was one of the country’s senior industrialists who was by 1933 with his firm the biggest supplier of imported yarn to the textile mills in India.  He left India after the partition and migrated with his three brothers Suleman Dawood, Siddiq Dawood, and Sattar Dawood including their entire families to Pakistan. The Dawood Corporation was the first entity set up in Karachi and Manchester, UK, to start business activities in 1948. It started initially from a small office and a shop in Karachi but their business grew over the coming decades.

While in 1970 all the undertakings together made it count as one of the largest business groups in the country, the following year marked an abrupt change: Following the creation of Bangladesh in 1971, almost 60% of the businesses led by Ahmed Dawood and all investments in East Pakistan were lost due to the nationalisation there. The remaining enterprises in Pakistan suffered further setbacks after the nationalisation in the early-mid-1970s.

Former subsidaries
 Memon Cooperative Bank
 Lahore Commercial Bank
 Punjab Cooperative Bank
 Pakistan Bank Limited
 Bank of Bahawalpur
 Central Insurance Company
 Dawood Petroleum
 Pakistan National Oil

See also
List of largest conglomerates in Pakistan
Dawood Hercules Corporation

References

Dawood family
Conglomerate companies of Pakistan